Nahr as-Sinn is a river in Syria which marks the borders between Tartus Governorate and Latakia Governorate.

History
In ancient times, the river was called "Siyannu" which marked the southern borders of Ugarit.

Course
Nahr as-Sinn rises in a plain area in Tartus Governorate and runs to the west to finally flow into the Mediterranean Sea south of Arab al-Mulk. Despite of its length which is only , it is considered the richest river in Syria.

References

External links
Nahr as Sinn - GeoNames

Rivers of Syria